
  

Stokes Bay is a locality in the Australian state of South Australia located on the north coast of Kangaroo Island overlooking Investigator Strait about  south-west of the state capital of Adelaide.  Its boundaries were created in March 2002 for the “long established name” and includes the Stokes Bay Shack Site.  Land use in the locality is principally for agricultural purposes with activity limited on the coastline to the north for conservation purposes.  A settlement also occupies land immediately adjoining the bay of the same name.  Stokes Bay is located within the federal division of Mayo, the state electoral district of Mawson and the local government area of the Kangaroo Island Council.

References
Notes

Citations

Towns on Kangaroo Island